Anineta, also known as Aninetum or Anineton, was a town of ancient Lydia or of Caria, and later of the Roman, and Byzantine empires, located in modern Turkey, the site of an ancient bishopric in (the Roman province of Asia) and was an important site early in christianity. Anineta remains today a titular see of the Roman Catholic Church in the ecclesiastical province of Ephesus. In addition it minted coins bearing the legend Ἀνινησίων.

Its site is located near Bögdelik in Asiatic Turkey.

Bishopric
The Diocese of Anineta (Dioecesis Aninetensis) is a suppressed and titular see of the Roman Catholic Church in the Roman province of Asia.  It was part of the Patriarchate of Constantinople and was suffragan of the Archdiocese of Ephesus.

The first bishop mentioned by any historical sources is Hermogene. the martyrology indicates he was a martyr and disciple of St. Paul.

Another two bishops of Anineta, are Teodoro who  participated in the Ecumenical Council of Ephesus (431) and Mamas  participated in the Council of Chalcedon (451). Today Anineta survives as a titular bishopric and the seat is vacant.

Bishops
 Hermogenes
 Teodoro (fl 431AD) 
 Mamas (or Modesto) (fl 451AD ) 
 Paweł Latusek (13 November 1961 – 16 February 1973)

References

Populated places in ancient Lydia
Populated places in ancient Caria
Roman towns and cities in Turkey
Former populated places in Turkey
Cultural history of Turkey
Populated places of the Byzantine Empire
Dioceses in Asia
Defunct dioceses of the Ecumenical Patriarchate of Constantinople
Catholic titular sees in Asia
History of Aydın Province